Jon Paul Link (born March 23, 1984) is an American former professional baseball pitcher.  He previously played for the Los Angeles Dodgers in 2010.

Professional career
Link was drafted by the San Diego Padres in the 26th round of the 2005 MLB Draft out of Bluefield College.  He was the first major league player who had played at Bluefield.

Chicago White Sox
The Padres traded him to the Chicago White Sox on July 31, 2007 for Rob Mackowiak. In 2008, he was selected to the Southern League All-Star Game while playing for the Birmingham Barons, joining fellow Barons Miguel Negron, Ricardo Nanita, Justin Cassel, and Carlos Torres. He was the only Baron on the post-season All-Star team, elected as the relief pitcher. He reached AAA with the Charlotte Knights in 2009, where he saved 13 games.

Los Angeles Dodgers
On December 18, 2009, he was traded to the Los Angeles Dodgers (along with John Ely) for Juan Pierre. He began the 2010 season as the closer for the Triple-A Albuquerque Isotopes. On April 18, he was called up to the Dodgers, making his first appearance on a Major League roster. He made his Major League debut on April 20, 2010 against the Cincinnati Reds. He worked two scoreless innings of relief in his debut and was then optioned back to Albuquerque after the game. Link was also on the Dodgers' roster for a few days in June when Chad Billingsley was injured. Link was recalled for the third time on July 11, while the Dodgers optioned the man he was traded with, John Ely, to Triple-A Albuquerque in the process. He returned to AAA soon after before rejoining the Dodgers when rosters expanded in September. Overall, he appeared in 9 games with the Dodgers, working 8.2 innings for a 4.15 ERA. With Albuquerque he was 3–2 with a 3.71 ERA in 45 games, and also made one start. After the season, he pitched for the Phoenix Desert Dogs in the Arizona Fall League. After clearing waivers on April 5, 2011, Link was assigned to the Isotopes.

Link spent all of 2011 with the Isotopes, where he appeared in 54 games (including making 1 start) and was 2–2 with a 4.24 ERA and 11 saves.

Baltimore Orioles
The Baltimore Orioles signed Link to a minor league contract on December 16, 2011. He appeared in 18 games in AAA for the Norfolk Tides and was 1-2 with a 3.48 ERA before the Orioles released him.

Miami Marlins
Link subsequently signed with the Miami Marlins and made 3 appearances for the Jacksonville Suns and 11 for the New Orleans Zephyrs.

Detroit Tigers
After making 7 starts to begin 2013 with the Wichita Wingnuts in the American Association of Independent Professional Baseball, he signed a minor league contract with the Detroit Tigers, where he was assigned to Double-A Erie. After 5 starts with the SeaWolves, he was promoted to Triple-A Toledo, where he made 11 appearances (7 starts) before season's end. In 23 appearances (19 starts) in 2013, he went 9-6 with a 2.80 ERA, striking out 78 in 135 innings.

Miami Marlins (second stint)
Link returned to Wichita in 2014 and pitched with the Wingnuts until August, when his contract was purchased by the Miami Marlins. He was sent to the Double-A Jacksonville Suns.

Wichita Wingnuts
Link returned to Wichita for the 2016 season. He became a free agent after the 2016 season.

References

External links

1984 births
Living people
Albuquerque Isotopes players
Baseball players from Columbus, Ohio
Birmingham Barons players
Bluefield Rams baseball players
Charlotte Knights players
Erie SeaWolves players
Eugene Emeralds players
Fort Wayne Wizards players
Jacksonville Suns players
Lake Elsinore Storm players
Los Angeles Dodgers players
Major League Baseball pitchers
New Orleans Zephyrs players
Norfolk Tides players
Phoenix Desert Dogs players
Tiburones de La Guaira players
American expatriate baseball players in Venezuela
Toledo Mud Hens players
Wichita Wingnuts players
Winston-Salem Warthogs players
Chantilly High School alumni